Victorino Otero Alonso (1896 – 30 November 1982) was a Spanish racing cyclist. He rode in the 1923 and 1924 editions of the Tour de France.

Major results
1923
 4th Overall Volta a Catalunya
1924
 3rd Overall Volta a Catalunya
1925
 2nd Overall Vuelta a Andalucía
1st Stage 2
1926
 3rd Overall Vuelta a Cantabria
1st Stage 2
 4th Overall Vuelta a Asturias

References

External links
 

1896 births
1982 deaths
Spanish male cyclists
People from El Bierzo
Sportspeople from the Province of León
Cyclists from Castile and León